Boherlahan–Dualla GAA is a Gaelic Athletic Association club associated with the villages of Boherlahan and Dualla in County Tipperary, Ireland. The parish of Boherlahan–Dualla is a large parish in Tipperary, and Boherlahan-Dualla GAA club competes in the Mid-Tipperary Division. The Boherlahan–Dualla parish borders seven parishes from three separate divisions, Holycross–Ballycahill GAA and Moycarkey–Borris GAA to the north who play in the Mid-Tipperary division, to the west it borders Knockavilla–Donaskeigh Kickhams GAA, Clonoulty–Rossmore GAA, Golden–Kilfeacle GAA and Cashel King Cormacs GAA, all of whom play in the West Tipperary divisoon, and to the east, Killenaule GAA who play in the South Tipperary division. The club is primarily involved in hurling, and throughout its history has produced many hurlers who have competed for the club and for the Tipperary county team. These include members of the Leahy, Maher, Coffey, and Power families.

Notable players
 Johnny Leahy – Tipperary – (1914–1926)
 Paddy Leahy – Tipperary – (1916–1920,1924–1927)
 Arthur O'Donnell – Tipperary – (1915–1918,1920,1922–1928)
 Jimmy Maher – Tipperary – (1940–1946)
 Sonny Maher – Tipperary – (1947–1951)
 Flor Coffey – Tipperary – (1941–1950)
 Seamus Power – Tipperary – (1971–1979,1984–1986)
 Conor Gleeson – Tipperary – (1995–2004)
 Phil Byrne
 John Coffey (a rare centenarian)
 Aidan Flanagan
 Tom Kevin
 Mick Leahy
 Jack Power
 Paddy Power
 Pat Power
 Tommy Ryan (1890s hurler)
 Ned Wade (Dublin)
 Denis Walsh

Boherlahane only?
 Tommy Leahy
 Jimmy Maher

Honours

Tipperary Senior Hurling Championship (16): 1896, 1897, 1898, 1901, 1915, 1916, 1917, 1918, 1922, 1924, 1925, 1927, 1928, 1941, 1996
 Tipperary Intermediate Hurling Championship (1): 1981
 Tipperary Junior A Hurling Championship (5); 1916, 1934, 1935, 1936, 2018
 Tipperary Junior A Football Championship (2): 1951, 1996
 Tipperary Junior B Hurling Championship (1): 2018
 Tipperary Junior B Football Championship (1): 1999
 Tipperary Under-21 B Football Championship (2): 1991, 2004
 Tipperary Minor A Hurling Championship (2): 1970, 1993
 Tipperary Minor B Hurling Championship (2): 1988, 1991
 Tipperary Minor B Football Championship (1): 1990

References

External links
 Tipperary GAA site
 https://boherlahanduallagaa.com/

1912 establishments in Ireland
Gaelic football clubs in County Tipperary
Gaelic games clubs in County Tipperary
Hurling clubs in County Tipperary